At the Drop of a Hat is a musical revue by Flanders and Swann, described by them as "an after-dinner farrago". In the show, they both sang on a nearly bare stage, accompanied by Swann on the piano. The songs were linked by contemporary social commentary, mostly by Flanders. After a long London run the show played in the US, Switzerland, and on tour in Britain.

Background
Michael Flanders and Donald Swann had performed together as schoolboys, collaborating in 1940 on a revue at Westminster School. They later collaborated on writing songs for revues, performed by such artists as Max Adrian, Elsie and Doris Waters, Ian Carmichael and Joyce Grenfell. They also wrote songs for Ian Wallace, some of which he recorded on the LP "Wallace's Private Zoo". As successful songwriters they were invited to lecture on the subject at Dartington International Summer School  in 1956. Flanders found that his spoken introductions were as well received by the audience as the songs themselves. He and Swann decided to give a show along similar lines in London. They approached Frederick Piffard, manager of the New Lindsey Theatre, a fringe venue seating about 150 people, outside the London West End theatre district, and played him some of their numbers. Swann recalled:
"Nice songs", said Freddie Piffard, "but who's in it?"
"Us," we said timidly.
"Well, you pay the rent," he said, "it's up to you."

The show opened on 31 December 1956 at the New Lindsey. No West End shows were opening on that evening, and consequently, as Swann put it, "quite a number of critics turned up on spec." In The Observer, Kenneth Tynan called the show "a witty and educated diversion … Mr. Swann, bent over his piano like a small mad scientist agog over some wild experiment, ideally complements the bearded suavity of Mr. Flanders, who exudes from his wheelchair the robust authority of him who came to dinner." Other notices were equally good, the box-office did excellent business, and the show transferred to the Fortune Theatre in the West End on 24 January 1957, where, according to The Times, "it took the audience by storm". It ran for 808 performances at the Fortune until 2 May 1959. On 8 October 1959 the show opened in New York at the John Golden Theatre, running there for 215 performances. In the New York Herald Tribune Walter Kerr wrote, "Whatever it is that runs through both these gentlemen's veins it makes them lively, witty, literate, ingratiating, explosively funny and excellent company for a daffy and delightful evening".

Description 
The two-man show was performed with Flanders in a wheelchair (as a result of polio contracted in 1943) and Swann at a grand piano on an otherwise empty stage. The only other person to appear on stage was the stage manager, who brought on and handed to Flanders the "little Edwardian hat" he wore for "Madeira, M'Dear?". The show consisted of a collection of mainly humorous songs, mostly written by them, connected by topical comments. A second revue called At the Drop of Another Hat was produced in 1963.

Each performance ended with the "Hippopotamus" song, in which the audience was encouraged to join in, followed, in Britain, by a musical rendition of the Lord Chamberlain's regulations.

Numbers 
Most of the numbers were performed as duets. Solos are noted in the table below. The numbers for the original performances were:

Source: The Donald Swann Website

Additional songs 

During the run of At the Drop of a Hat, the writers added new songs and dropped others. These included:

Recordings 

Two LP discs of At the Drop of a Hat were issued by Parlophone. The first (PMC  1033), in mono, consisted of recordings made at the show's 50th performance at the Fortune Theatre on 21 February 1957 and another show on 25 February.  The numbers on the LP are

 Side one
 A Transport of Delight
 Song of Reproduction
 A Gnu
 Design for Living
 Je suis le ténébreux
 Songs for Our Time:
 Philological Waltz
 Satellite Moon
 A Happy Song

 Side two
 A Song of the Weather
 The Reluctant Cannibal
 Greensleeves
 Misalliance
 Miranda
 Kokoraki – A Greek Song
 Madeira, M'Dear?
 Hippopotamus
 Encore – Words from the Lord Chamberlain's regulations: The Public May Leave.

The second LP recording, in stereo, (Parlophone PCS 3001) was made at the Fortune on the last night of the West End run, on 2 May 1959. The numbers on the LP were the same as those on the earlier recording, with the exceptions of "Kokoraki" and "The Public May Leave", which were omitted.

Other songs from the original show, recorded by Flanders and Swann

CDs
After the deaths of Flanders and Swann many private recordings came to light in their personal collections and elsewhere. Two substantial CD sets have been assembled drawing on these, and the original EMI recordings, together with a 1974 BBC radio programme in which the writers revived some of their neglected numbers. The sets are:

The Complete Flanders and Swann (EMI, 1991)
The numbers from the original programme of At the Drop of a Hat in this three CD set comprise all those on the original Parlophone LP, plus "Bed", "Too Many Cookers", "Vanessa", "Tried by the Centre Court", "The Youth of the Heart", "The Warthog" and "Mopy Dick".

Hat-Trick: Flanders & Swann Collector's Edition (EMI, 2007)
A four disc set. The numbers from the original programme of At the Drop of a Hat are as in the 1991 CD set, with the addition of "Miranda".

See also
"At the Drop of a Hat", a short story by Denise Hamilton in the anthology Thriller (2006)

Notes

References

External links 

 
 Information about the several productions
 at the drop of a hat idiom
 The Guide to Musical Theatre - At the Drop of a Hat
 Allmusic review of the album
 Clip of "The Wompom" (1962), posted by permission of the Flanders & Swann Estates

1957 musicals
Revues